The Ephrata Area School District is a midsized, suburban, public school district located in Lancaster County, Pennsylvania, US. Ephrata Area School District encompasses approximately 44 square miles. At the 2000 federal census it served a resident population of 30,458. In 2009 the district residents' annual per capita income was US$19,574, while the median family income was $51,151 a year. The district is a member of Lancaster-Lebanon Intermediate Unit (IU) 13.

Schools
 Akron Elementary School – Akron, Pennsylvania K-4 with 311 pupils & 19 teachers
 Clay Elementary School – Ephrata, Pennsylvania K-4 with 455 pupils & 28 teachers
 Highland Elementary School – Ephrata, Pennsylvania K-5 with 453 pupils & 33 teachers
 Fulton Elementary School – Ephrata, Pennsylvania PreK-5 with 464 pupils & 29 teachers
 Ephrata Area Intermediate School Ephrata, Pennsylvania
 Ephrata Area Middle School
 Ephrata High School
 Ephrata High School @ Washington
(note: the links just give you facts about where the schools are located not about the schools)

References

Ephrata, Pennsylvania
School districts in Lancaster County, Pennsylvania